DNA directed RNA polymerase II polypeptide J-related gene, also known as POLR2J2, is a human gene.

This gene is a member of the RNA polymerase II subunit 11 gene family, which includes three genes in a cluster on chromosome 7q22.1 and a pseudogene on chromosome 7p13. The founding member of this family, DNA directed RNA polymerase II polypeptide J, has been shown to encode a subunit of RNA polymerase II, the polymerase responsible for synthesizing messenger RNA in eukaryotes. This locus produces multiple, alternatively spliced transcripts that potentially express isoforms with distinct C-termini compared to DNA directed RNA polymerase II polypeptide J. 

Most or all variants are spliced to include additional non-coding exons at the 3' end which makes them candidates for nonsense-mediated decay (NMD). Consequently, it is not known if this locus expresses a protein or proteins in vivo.

References

Further reading